Eurynome (minor planet designation: 79 Eurynome) is a quite large and bright main-belt asteroid composed of silicate rock. Eurynome was discovered by J. C. Watson on September 14, 1863. It was his first asteroid discovery and is named after one of the many Eurynomes in Greek mythology. It is orbiting the Sun with a period of 3.82 years and has a rotation period of six hours. This is the eponymous member of a proposed asteroid family with at least 43 members, including 477 Italia and 917 Lyka.

References

External links 
 
 

Background asteroids
Eurynome
Eurynome
S-type asteroids (Tholen)
S-type asteroids (SMASS)
18630914

vec:Lista de asteroidi#79 Eurinoma